This is a list of areas and neighbourhoods in Cochin by region.

North Cochin

Pachalam
Elamakkara
Cheranellur
Palarivattom
Edapally

Central Cochin

 High Court Junction
 Thevara
 Panampilly Nagar
 Gandhi Nagar, Kochi
 Ravipuram
 Pachalam
 Kathrikadavu
 Thammanam
 Kadavanthra
 Kaloor
 Ernakulam town\North
 Ravipuram
 Ernakulam South
 Kalabhavan Road

West Cochin

 Marine Drive, Kochi
 Willingdon Island
 Fort Kochi
 Mattancherry
 Thoppumpady
 Palluruthy
 Chellanam
 Kumbalangi

South Cochin

Kundannoor
Edakochi
Maradu
Thykoodam
Chambakkara

East Cochin

Kakkanad
Vennala
Thrikkakara
Vyttila
Tripunithura
Piravom

Suburban Cochin

The Suburban Cochin includes minor places in the districts of Thrissur and Alleppy also. Suburban Cochin is commonly called as Greater Cochin

Northern Suburbs of Cochin

 Kalamassery
 Aluva
 Angamaly
 North Paravur
 Eloor
 Koonammavu
Vaduthala

Western Suburb of Cochin

 Vypin Island
 Cherai

Southern Suburbs of Cochin

 Kumbalam
Udayamperoor
Panangad
 Eramallur
Vaikom

Eastern Suburbs of Cochin
Kothamangalam 
Perumbavoor
Eroor
Thiruvankulam
Kolenchery
Mamala
Kizhakkambalam
Piravom
Mulanthuruthy
Chottanikkara

Satellite Towns

Kothamangalam
Moovattupuzha
Chalakudy
Koothattukulam
Kodungallur
Cherthala
Thodupuzha
Perumbavoor

Satellite cities.
Thrissur

Important Roads of Cochin

MG Road, Kochi
S.A Road
Chittoor Road
Shanmugham Road
Kochi Bypass
Kalabhavan Road
Banerji Road
Park Avenue, Kochi
Seaport-Airport Road
Vallarpadam Container Road
North Paravur-Cochin International Airport Road
Infopark Expressway

References 

Neighbourhoods in Kochi
Kochi
Kochi-related lists